The National Black Golf Hall of Fame was started by Harold Dunovant, the first African-American to graduate from the PGA of America's business school in 1964. He was unable to become a Class A PGA Member for six years because no one would sign his application. Inductees include:

Willie Black, caddy and golfer who headed up construction and operations of Tampa, Florida's Rogers Park, Tampa course
Barbara Douglas, the first minority member of the USGA Women's Committee (and later its chair)
Ann Gregory, the first African-American woman to play in a national championship conducted by the United States Golf Association.
John Merchant, the first minority on the USGA Executive Committee
 Winston Lake Golf Course in Winston-Salem, North Carolina.
Renee Powell, the second African-American woman ever to play on the LPGA Tour.

References

External links

Golf museums and halls of fame
Halls of fame in Georgia (U.S. state)
African-American museums in Georgia (U.S. state)